Channahon is a village in Grundy and Will counties in the U.S. state of Illinois. The population was 13,706 at the 2020 census. 

Located in a rural area southwest of Joliet, Illinois, Channahon lies at the confluence of the Des Plaines, Kankakee, and DuPage rivers, where they form the Illinois River.  The Illinois and Michigan Canal runs through the village, intersecting the DuPage at Channahon State Park. Most of the village is within Channahon Township in Will County.  The current village president is Missey Moorman Schumacher.

History
Archaeological evidence suggests that the land on which the village now stands was inhabited as long as three to four thousand years ago by Mound Builders. When white settlers first arrived in the early 1830s, the region was populated by Potawatomi, with whom the early settlers had friendly relations. They called the area "Channahon" in honor of its meaning in Potawatomi, "meeting of the waters." After a brief period of growth, the settlement dissolved.

When construction of the I&M Canal began in 1836, Channahon was chosen as the site for one of the waterway's locks. In 1845, Myrvin Benjamin plotted a new settlement to take advantage of the two rivers and nearly-completed canal surrounding the location. First called "DuPage" for the river and then "Swifton" for the I&M Canal board president, the settlement was named Channahon when the township government was organized in 1850. Channahon prospered until the rise of railroad transportation in the late 19th century caused commerce and population in the canal town to decline. The Village of Channahon was first incorporated in 1896, but dissolved in 1908 to avoid a lawsuit after an automobile plummeted into the DuPage River due to a bridge failure.

The Channahon community saw slow growth in the first half of the 20th century. On December 11, 1961, the area was reincorporated as the Village of Channahon. Serious development finally began in the 1970s as the village's proximity to two major interstates resulted in both residential and industrial growth (a Mobil oil refinery, two petrochemicals plants, a soybean oil production facility, CenterPoint Intermodal Center to the east in Elwood, Illinois, and numerous warehouses to the east in both Elwood and Joliet, Illinois, including Amazon and Walmart distribution centers). Channahon, once a farming community, has developed into an affluent suburb of Chicago.

Geography

Climate
Channahon experiences cold winters with plenty of snow. Its summers are hot and humid, with cooling rains occurring frequently. The temperatures vary from 18°F to 84°F on average, with extremes reaching -2°F and 92°F on average. 

Cloud coverage in Channahon varies from month to month. The time of the year with the most clouds is October 27 to June 13. The cloudiest month on average is December, and the least cloudy month on average is August.

Channahon has differing amounts of precipitation throughout the year. The time with the most rain is between March 27 to September 24. The month with the most precipitation is June.

Demographics

As of the census of 2000, there were 7,344 people, 2,279 households, and 1,989 families residing in the village. The racial makeup of the village was 97.22% White, 0.42% African American, 0.11% Native American, 0.27% Asian, none Pacific Islander, 0.95% from other races, and 1.02% from two or more races.  3.64% of the population were Hispanic or Latino of any race.

There were 2,279 households, out of which 50.8% had children under the age of 18 living with them, 78.6% were married couples living together, 5.4% had a female householder with no husband present, and 12.7% were non-families. 10.0% of all households were made up of individuals, and 2.8% had someone living alone who was 65 years of age or older.  The average household size was 3.22 and the average family size was 3.47.

In the village, the population was spread out, with 32.8% under the age of 18, 7.2% from 18 to 24, 33.8% from 25 to 44, 20.9% from 45 to 64, and 5.3% who were 65 years of age or older.  The median age was 34 years. For every 100 females, there were 105.7 males.  For every 100 females age 18 and over, there were 102.7 males.

The median income for a household in the village was $71,991, and the median income for a family was $74,481. Males had a median income of $52,479 versus $31,692 for females. The per capita income for the village was $22,867.  About 1.8% of families and 1.7% of the population were below the poverty line, including 1.7% of those under age 18 and 3.8% of those age 65 or over.

Arts and culture

Historic sites
The Illinois and Michigan Canal runs through the village, where it passes the locktender's house at Canal Lock No. 6 as well as the Dresden Mule Barn. The Briscoe Mounds stand near the Des Plaines River.

Parks and recreation
Facilities include:
Channahon State Park, offering fishing and recreation beside the DuPage River; site of Forgotten Warrior Memorial.
McKinley Woods, featuring over 4 miles of walking trails near the banks of the Des Plaines River.
 Community Park, Central Park, and Arroyo Trails.
 Heritage Bluffs Public Golf Club.
 Heritage Crossing Field House, with two gymnasiums, an indoor track, and fitness center.

Government
Channahon is run by a Village Board of Trustees. The current President of the Board of Trustees is Missey Schumacher (elected in April 2015). At the county level, Will County residents are located within Board District 6, and are represented by Don Gould (R-Shorewood) and Joe VanDuyne (D-Wilmington). Grundy County residents are part of Board District 2, and they are represented by Chris Balkema (R), Debra Jo Kinsella (R), Lana Phillips (D), Eric Rasmusson (R), Greg Ridenour (R), and Deb Warning (R). In the Illinois State Senate, Channahon is represented by:

In the Illinois House of Representatives, Channhon is represented by:

At the federal level, Channahon is represented by: Senators Dick Durbin (D-Illinois), Tammy Duckworth (D-Illinois), and Representative Adam Kinzinger (R-16th District).

References

External links

 

 
1836 establishments in Illinois
Populated places established in 1836
Villages in Grundy County, Illinois
Villages in Illinois
Villages in Will County, Illinois